History of metal may refer to:
 Metallurgy#History
 Heavy metal music#History